Stephen M. Tiru (1 December 1937 – 3 March 2012) was the Roman Catholic bishop of the Roman Catholic Diocese of Khunti, India.

Ordained to the priesthood in 1969, Tiru became bishop in 1986.

Notes

1937 births
2012 deaths
21st-century Roman Catholic bishops in India
20th-century Roman Catholic bishops in India